Monte Minisfreddo is a mountain of Lombardy, Italy.

Mountains of the Alps
Mountains of Lombardy